This page describes the qualification procedure for the 2007 U.S. Open Cup.

Major League Soccer
2 teams advance (1 from each bracket) to tournament 
Top team hosts match

USL 1st Division
All 9 US-based USL First Division teams will be entered into the Cup. The Puerto Rico Islanders are not eligible for the tournament, as Puerto Rico has a soccer federation independent from US Soccer.

USL 2nd Division
Top 6 teams in table will advance to tournament
All regular season games through May 28 count 
Green indicates U.S. Open Cup berth clinched

USL Premier Development League
Winners in each division advance to tournament
All teams play 4 designated games doubled as regular season games 
Green indicates U.S. Open Cup berth clinched

Central Conference

Great Lakes Division

Heartland Division

Eastern Conference

Mid Atlantic Division

Northeast Division

Southern Conference

Mid South Division

Southeast Division

Western Conference

Northwest Division

Southwest Division

*-maximum goal differential of +/- 3 per game

USASA

Region 1
Teams that reach final advance to tournament

Region 2
Teams that reach final advance to tournament.

Region 3
Winners of groups advance to tournament 
All matches at Jordan Soccer Complex in Fayetteville, North Carolina 
Green indicates U.S. Open Cup berth clinched

Group A

Group B

Matches

Region 4
Teams that reach final advance to tournament 
All times in Pacific Daylight Time

First round
Winners of groups plus best second-place finisher advance to Semifinal
Green indicates advancement to Semifinal

Group A

Group B

Group C

First round matches

* - Southern California Fusion were forced to forfeit the match (originally a 3-2 win) due to use of an illegal player

Tournament

See also
 2007 U.S. Open Cup
 United States Soccer Federation
 Lamar Hunt U.S. Open Cup
 Major League Soccer
 United Soccer Leagues
 USASA
 National Premier Soccer League

Qual